The Word Biblical Commentary (WBC) is a series of commentaries in English on the text of the Bible both Old and New Testament. It is currently published by the Zondervan Publishing Company.  Initially published under the "Word Books" imprint, the series spent some time as part of the Thomas Nelson list. When this publisher was acquired by HarperCollins the series was assigned to another of the group's publishers, Zondervan.

Old Testament
 
 
 
 
 
 

 
 
 replaced

New Testament
 
 
 
 
 
 
 
 
Acts 1-14 (forthcoming from Steven J. Walton)
Acts 15-28 (forthcoming from Steven J. Walton)
 
 
1 Corinthians (forthcoming from Andrew D. Clarke)
 
 replaced

Reception
A 1996 Christianity Today magazine article included the commentary in a list of the more significant publications and achievements of evangelicalism in the latter half of the 20th century.  A 2010 CT article listed the WBC as among various recommended commentaries for use.

See also 
 Exegesis
 Textual criticism
 New International Greek Testament Commentary

References 

Biblical commentaries